Markis Derek McDuffie (born September 6, 1997) is an American professional basketball player for JDA Dijon of the LNB Pro A and the Basketball Champions League. He played college basketball for the Wichita State Shockers.

High school career
McDuffie grew up in Paterson, New Jersey and played for the Sports U program as a child. He attended St. Anthony High School in Jersey City, New Jersey, playing under coach Bob Hurley. As a junior, McDuffie averaged 14.4 points per game. He committed to playing college basketball for Wichita State over VCU, Boston College, SMU, Maryland, and Rutgers, among others.

College career
McDuffie averaged 7.4 points per game and 3.3 rebounds per game as a freshman, earning Missouri Valley Conference (MVC) Freshman of the Year honors. As a sophomore, McDuffie averaged 11.5 points and 5.7 rebounds per game. He was named to the First Team All-MVC. McDuffie was limited to 22 games during his junior season due to a broken foot. He averaged 8.5 points and 3.1 rebounds per game. Following the season, McDuffie declared for the 2018 NBA draft but ultimately returned to Wichita State. As a senior, he averaged 18.2 points, 5 rebounds, and 1 assist per game. McDuffie helped lead the team to a 22–15 record and the NIT semifinals. He was named to the Second Team All-AAC.

Professional career
After going undrafted in the 2019 NBA draft, McDuffie joined the Indiana Pacers in the NBA Summer League. In August 2019, he signed with Alba Fehérvár of the Hungarian Nemzeti Bajnokság I/A. McDuffie averaged 12.5 points and 4.6 rebounds per game. On August 7, 2020, he signed with Unione Cestistica Casalpusterlengo of the Italian Serie A2 Basket. McDuffie averaged 20.4 points, 6.3 rebounds and 1.3 steals per game for the team, shooting 48% from the floor. On August 6, 2021, he signed with Napoli Basket of the Italian Lega Basket Serie A.

On July 13, 2022, he has signed with JDA Dijon of the LNB Pro A.

Career statistics

College

|-
| style="text-align:left;"| 2015–16
| style="text-align:left;"| Wichita State
| 34 || 1 || 18.5 || .426 || .315 || .714 || 3.3 || .7 || .8 || .2 || 7.4
|-
| style="text-align:left;"| 2016–17
| style="text-align:left;"| Wichita State
| 36 || 28 || 25.5 || .458 || .355 || .819 || 5.7 || 1.7 || 1.2 || .3 || 11.5
|-
| style="text-align:left;"| 2017–18
| style="text-align:left;"| Wichita State
| 22 || 4 || 18.9 || .444 || .339 || .731 || 3.1 || 1.1 || .4 || .1 || 8.5
|-
| style="text-align:left;"| 2018–19
| style="text-align:left;"| Wichita State
| 37 || 37 || 33.4 || .408 || .341 || .816 || 5.0 || 1.0 || 1.0 || .2 || 18.2
|- class="sortbottom"
| style="text-align:center;" colspan="2"| Career
| 129 || 70 || 24.8 || .428 || .340 || .791 || 4.4 || 1.1 || .9 || .2 || 11.8

References

External links
Wichita State Shockers bio

1997 births
Living people
Alba Fehérvár players
American expatriate basketball people in Hungary
American expatriate basketball people in Italy
American men's basketball players
Basketball players from Paterson, New Jersey
JDA Dijon Basket players
Small forwards
St. Anthony High School (New Jersey) alumni
Wichita State Shockers men's basketball players
Napoli Basket players